Etoile d'Or Mirontsy FC is a Comorian football club located in Mirontsi, Comoros.  It currently plays in the Comoros Premier League.

In 2008 the team has won the Comoros Premier League.

Honours
Comoros Premier League: 1
2008

Stadium
Currently the team plays at the 1000 capacity Stade de Mirontsy.

References

External links
Team profile – soccerway.com

Football clubs in the Comoros